Huntington University may refer to:

Huntington University (Canada) in Ontario
Huntington University (United States) in Indiana
Huntingdon College in Montgomery, Alabama was formerly a women's college